Ann A. Peel (born February 27, 1961) is a Canadian retired race walker.

Personal bests

 5000 m: 22:01.09 min, 17 July 1987, Zagreb
 10 km: 45:06 min, 3 May 1987, New York City

Achievements

References

External links
 
 
 

1961 births
Living people
Athletes from Ottawa
Canadian female racewalkers
Athletes (track and field) at the 1987 Pan American Games
Athletes (track and field) at the 1990 Commonwealth Games
Pan American Games track and field athletes for Canada
Pan American Games silver medalists for Canada
Pan American Games medalists in athletics (track and field)
Commonwealth Games competitors for Canada
World Athletics Championships athletes for Canada
Universiade medalists in athletics (track and field)
Universiade bronze medalists for Canada
World Athletics Indoor Championships medalists
Medalists at the 1987 Summer Universiade
Medalists at the 1987 Pan American Games